Paso Robles station is an intercity rail station in Paso Robles, California, United States. It is served by the daily Amtrak Coast Starlight, as well as by Amtrak Thruway bus services connecting with Pacific Surfliner and San Joaquins trains. 

The current station building was constructed in 1997–98. The original 1886-built station building, just to the south, is occupied by retail space.

References

External links

Paso Robles, CA USA RailGuide – (TrainWeb)

Amtrak stations in San Luis Obispo County, California
Amtrak Thruway Motorcoach stations in San Luis Obispo County, California
Buildings and structures in Paso Robles, California
Former Southern Pacific Railroad stations in California
Railway stations in the United States opened in 1886
1886 establishments in California